The 1973 NAIA men's basketball tournament was held in March at Municipal Auditorium in Kansas City, Missouri. The 36th annual NAIA basketball tournament featured 32 teams playing in a single-elimination format. Valdosta State ended (3) Kentucky State's run to get 4 championship in a row by upsetting (3) Kentucky State in the first round by 9.

Awards and honors
Leading scorer:
Leading rebounder:
Player of the Year: est. 1994

1973 NAIA bracket

Third-place game
The third-place game featured the losing teams from the national semifinalist to determine 3rd and 4th places in the tournament. This game was played until 1988.

See also
 1973 NCAA University Division basketball tournament
 1973 NCAA College Division basketball tournament

References

NAIA Men's Basketball Championship
Tournament
NAIA men's basketball tournament
NAIA men's basketball tournament
College basketball tournaments in Missouri
Basketball competitions in Kansas City, Missouri